Kabekona Lake is a clear lake in northern Minnesota, United States, located 2.5 miles south of Laporte in Hubbard County. Kabekona (Gabekana in the Ojibwe language) means "End of the Trail" to dissuade others from venturing to the very clear lake. Kabekona is the 2nd clearest lake in Minnesota. This spring-fed lake is known for its loon birdlife. At one point it was thought to be the source of the Mississippi River. Among the most popular fishes in this lake are yellow perch, bass, northern pike, and walleye. Kabekona Lake was formerly known as "Friendship Springs". The best fishing spot on the lake is known as “Keay Point”, named after the family who lives close by.

External links
 Minnesota DNR Lake Report

Lakes of Minnesota
Lakes of Hubbard County, Minnesota